Davutpaşa—YTÜ is a rapid transit station on the M1 line of the Istanbul Metro located in southern Esenler, close to the entrance of Yıldız Technical University or YTÜ. It was opened on 31 January 1994 as part of the Otogar-Zeytinburnu extension and is one of five stations of this extension.

Layout

References

Istanbul metro stations
Railway stations opened in 1994